The Emperor of Japan is the ceremonial monarch in Japan's system of constitutional monarchy and is the head of the Japanese Imperial Family.

Emperor of Japan may also refer to:
 Akihito (born 1933), emperor of Japan 1989–2019
 Naruhito (born 1960), Emperor of Japan since 2019
 Emperor of Japan, fictional character in musical stage work The Mikado

See also
 List of Emperors of Japan
 Empress of Japan